Ake is an archaeological site of the pre-Columbian Maya civilization, located in the state of Yucatán, Mexico.

Ake or AKE may also refer to:

Places
 Ake Site, archaeological site near the town of Datil, New Mexico, US
 Principality of Ake, medieval dynasty in central Kurdistan
 Ake (Ἄκη), classical Greek name of Acre, Israel

People

Given name
 Åke, a given name, origin and list of people with the first name "Åke"
 A'ke, a fictional character in The Deer and the Cauldron

Surname
 Claude Ake (1939–1996), Nigerian political scientist
 Godspower Ake (1940–2016), Nigerian politician
 Wilson Asinobi Ake, member of the Senate of Nigeria
 Nathan Aké, (born 1995), Dutch footballer, currently playing for Manchester City
 Simeon Aké, (1932–2009), Ivorian politician

Abbreviations
 Authenticated Key Exchange, in cryptography

Other uses
 Ake language
 Ake and His World, children's fiction book by Swedish poet Bertil Malmberg, published in 1924
 Aké: The Years of Childhood, a 1981 memoir by Nigerian Nobel Laureate Wole Soyinka
 Aké Arts and Book Festival, an annual cultural event named after the town in Abeokuta, Nigeria, where Wole Soyinka was born
 Ake v. Oklahoma, US Supreme Court case that held an indigent criminal defendant has a right to have the state provide a psychiatric evaluation to be used in the defendant's behalf if the defendant needs it
Akieni Airport, Gabon (IATA code AKE)
 AKE, the US Navy designation for a Dry Stores Replenishment Ship

See also
 Akçe, an Ottoman coin
 Ackee, a fruit popular in Jamaican cuisine